Joyeuxilepis is a genus of tapeworms in the family Amabiliidae. It contains 6 known species.

Species
 Joyeuxilepis acanthorhyncha (Wedl, 1855) Borgarenko & Gulyaev, 1990
 Joyeuxilepis biuncinata (Joyeux & Gaud, 1945) Spassky, 1947
 Joyeuxilepis decacantha (Fuhrmann, 1913) Gulyaev, 1989
 Joyeuxilepis decacanthoides Borgarenko & Gulyaev, 1991
 Joyeuxilepis fuhrmanni (Solomon, 1932) Borgarenko & Gulyaev, 1990
 Joyeuxilepis uralensis Gulyaev, 1989

References

Cestoda genera
Cestoda